The Battle of the Kalka River in 1381 was fought between the Mongol warlords Mamai and Toqtamish (also spelt Tokhtamysh) for control of the Golden Horde. Toqtamish was the victor and became sole ruler of the Horde.

Mamai previously had de facto control over the Horde (though he was never declared khan) however his control began to crumble when Toqtamish of the White Horde invaded. At the same time the Rus princes rebelled against Mongol rule, removing a valuable source of tax income from Mamai. Mamai invaded the Rus but was defeated at the famous Battle of Kulikovo. Meanwhile Toqtamish in the east had seized the Golden Horde's capital, Sarai. Mamai used his remaining money to raise a small army and met Toqtamish at the region around the northern Donets and Kalka Rivers. No details of the battle remain but Toqtamish, who probably had a larger army, won a decisive victory. He subsequently took over the Golden Horde.

References

1381 in Europe
1380s in the Mongol Empire
Conflicts in 1381